Emergence delirium is a condition in which emergence from general anesthesia is accompanied by psychomotor agitation. Some see a relation to pavor nocturnus while others see a relation to the excitement stage of anesthesia.

Children
The pediatric anesthesia emergence delirium scale may be used to measure the severity of this condition in children.

Elderly
Elderly people are more likely to experience confusion or problems with thinking following surgery, which can occur up to several days postoperatively. These cognitive problems can last for weeks or months, and can affect the patients’ ability to plan, focus, remember, or undertake activities of daily living. A review of intravenous versus inhalational maintenance of anaesthesia for postoperative cognitive outcomes in elderly people undergoing non-cardiac surgery showed little or no difference in postoperative delirium according to the type of anaesthetic maintenance agents from five studies (321 participants). The authors of this review were uncertain whether maintenance of anaesthesia with propofol-based total intravenous anaesthesia (TIVA) or with inhalational agents can affect incidences of postoperative delirium.

Epidemiology
The overall incidence of emergence delirium is 5.3%, with a significantly greater incidence (12–13%) in children. The incidence of emergence delirium after halothane, isoflurane, sevoflurane or desflurane ranges from 2–55%.
Most emergence delirium in the literature describes agitated emergence. Unless a delirium detection tool is used, it is difficult to distinguish if the agitated emergence from anesthesia was from delirium or pain or fear, etc. A research study of 400 adult patients emerging from general anesthesia in the PACU were assessed for delirium using the Confusion Assessment Method for the ICU (CAM-ICU) found rates of emergence delirium of 31% at PACU admission with rates declining to 8% by 1 hour.

References

Further reading

External links 

Anesthesia